Disocactus ackermannii is an epiphytic cactus from tropical forests in the states of Veracruz and Oaxaca, Mexico. In cultivation, it has been confused with Disocactus × jenkinsonii, a hybrid between D. phyllanthoides and D. speciosus.

Description

The filaments are red but the base is usually greenish. The anthers are pale rose. The style are red. The stigma is purplish.

Range and habitat
Disocactus ackermannii is native to the states of Chiapas, Oaxaca, Puebla, and Veracruz in southern Mexico. It inhabits cloud forests in the Sierra Madre de Oaxaca and Chiapas Highlands between 1,800 and 2,500 meters elevation.

Taxonomy
The species was originally named Epiphyllum ackermannii by Adrian Hardy Haworth in 1829. There are three sets of synonyms:
 Haworth's Epiphyllum ackermannii was successively transferred to Cactus ackermannii (1830), Cereus ackermannii (1837), Phyllocactus ackermannii (1842) and Nopalxochia ackermannii (1935) before the current Disocactus ackermannii (1991).
 Phyllocactus weingartii A.Berger is an independent synonym.
 Nopalxochia conzattianum was named by Thomas Baillie MacDougall in 1947. It was successively transferred to Pseudonopalxochia conzattianum (1959) and Nopalxochia ackermannii var. conzattianum (1981) before the current Disocactus ackermannii var. conzattianum (1991).

Two varieties are currently recognized.

Cultivation
In cultivation, Disocactus × jenkinsonii, a hybrid between D. phyllanthoides and D. speciosus, has been confused with D. ackermannii and is often distributed under the name "Phyllocactus ackermannii".

Disocactus ackermannii has gained the Royal Horticultural Society’s Award of Garden Merit.

References

External links

ackermannii
Cacti of Mexico
Flora of Oaxaca
Flora of Veracruz
Endemic flora of Mexico
Garden plants of North America
Flora of the Sierra Madre de Oaxaca
Flora of the Chiapas Highlands
Cloud forest flora of Mexico